Hugh John Godley, 2nd Baron Kilbracken (12 June 1877 – 13 October 1950) was an Irish barrister and nobleman from County Leitrim.

Godley was educated as a lawyer, and was appointed a King's Counsel in January 1924. He became counsel to the Lord Chairman of Committees of the House of Lords.

Godley succeeded his father as the 2nd Baron Kilbracken in 1932, and he was married to Elizabeth Helen Monteith Hamilton.

As a lover of music and good friend of the pianist and composer Donald Tovey he was also a committee member in the London Classical Concert Society around 1913.

He was succeeded by his son John  to the barony upon his death in 1950.

References

Kilbracken
Kilbracken
Kilbracken, Hugh Godley, 2nd Baron
People from County Leitrim